Calamagrostis foliosa is a species of grass known by the common name leafy reedgrass. It is endemic to northern California, where it grows in the forests and scrub on the coastline.

Description
Calamagrostis foliosa is perennial bunchgrass, producing a tuft of stems 30 to 60 centimeters tall. The leaves are mostly located about the base of the stems.

The inflorescence is a dense, narrow sheaf of spikelets up to 12 centimeters long. The fruit of each spikelet is tipped with a bent awn.

References

External links

Jepson Manual Treatment: Calamagrostis foliosa
USDA Plants Profile: Calamagrostis foliosa
Calamagrostis foliosa Photo gallery

foliosa
Endemic flora of California
Native grasses of California
Bunchgrasses of North America
Natural history of the California chaparral and woodlands
Natural history of the California Coast Ranges
Garden plants of North America